Gabbro is a village in Tuscany, central Italy, administratively a frazione of the comune of Rosignano Marittimo, province of Livorno. At the time of the 2011 census its population was 898.

The village is about 12 km from Livorno and 10 km from Rosignano Marittimo.

It gave its name to the type of rock known as gabbro.

References

External links 
 

Frazioni of the Province of Livorno